Anathallis stenophylla is a species of orchid plant native to Colombia.

References 

stenophylla
Flora of Colombia